Krum was the Khan of the First Bulgarian Empire from 803 to 814.

Krum may also refer to:

Places
Krum, Haskovo Province, a village in Bulgaria
Krum, Texas

People
Krum (rapper) (born 1977), American hip hop artist and musician
Krum (singer) (born 1986), Bulgarian singer
Krum Bibishkov (born 1982), Bulgarian footballer
Charles L. Krum, American engineer and key figure in the development of the teleprinter
Hobart Krum (1833–1914), New York politician
John Krum (1810–1883), mayor of St. Louis, Missouri
Paola Krum (born 1970), Argentine actress, singer, and dancer

Other
KRUM-LD, a television station in Seattle, Washington
Viktor Krum, a Harry Potter character

ru:Крум (значения)